Edgar Browne Hager (1868–1935) was a criminal defense lawyer known for his oratory skills, mayor of Ashland, Kentucky, and president of the Kentucky Municipal League.

Early life and education
Hager's father was Samuel Patton Hager, who worked as a lawyer in Ohio, and later moved to Charleston, West Virginia to run a coal corporation. Hager came to Ashland with his parents in April 1881, becoming a student at Beech Grove Academy in 1884.

Hager went on to graduate with an AB from Kentucky Wesleyan College in June 1888 as a Phi Delta Phi. After graduation he worked as a superintendent of schools in Catlettsburg, Kentucky then resigned to pursuit law studies. In June 1891, he graduated simultaneously with an LLB from Boston University School of Law and an AM degree from Wesleyan. In August 1891 he was admitted to the Kentucky bar.

Legal career
Hager became a prominent criminal lawyer in Ashland, Kentucky and in Chattanooga, Tennessee, working across several other state boundaries. As a lawyer, he was noted for his oratory abilities.

In 1907, he was appointed state auditor's agent by his cousin, state auditor Wilber S. Hager.

In 1929, Hager was designated special judge in a case in the Floyd Circuit Court between J. H. Nunnery and the Pike Floyd Coal Company when the regular judge, C. B. Wheeler, was disqualified.

Political career
Hager ran in the Democratic primary for the House of Representatives in Kentucky's 9th congressional district three times, in 1906, 1908, and 1910. In the second, he was defeated by later US Representative James Nicholas Kehoe. In the third, Hager was beaten by William J. Fields, who went on to become Governor of Kentucky. In 1918, during the final days of WWI and its immediate aftermath, Hager travelled to France with the YMCA.

In 1932, at the age of 64, Hager was elected mayor of Ashland, Kentucky. Immediately after becoming Mayor of Ashland he reached out to neighboring cities across state lines, such as Portsmouth, Ohio, to forge closer relationships. Hager engaged in the purchase of a police radio system, funded by Ashland's merchants. In 1933, he became the fifth person to be elected president of the Kentucky Municipal League, succeeding City Manager Paul Morton of Lexington. Hager, who had previously served as vice president of the league under Paul Morton,  started his term on January 1 of 1934. Hager was succeeded as president of the Kentucky Municipal League by (also Democrat) Mayor Edward G. Scott of Paducah. Hager served as Mayor of Ashland until his death in office in December 1935.

Family, death, and legacy
Edgar Hager had five brothers, of whom two died at an early age, and a half-brother through his father's first wife. He was cousins with Louisville politician and state auditor Wilbur S. Hager (1858–1918), the father of the journalist and Owensboro Messenger-Inquirer publisher Lawrence W. Hager (1923–2016). Edgar Hager was also first cousins with Judge John Franklin Hager (1852–1933) of Ashland, after whom the city's Hager Elementary School was named.

Edgar Hager married Lucie Vinson Prichard from  Louisa, Kentucky on June 21, 1898. Ms. Hager died on January 20, 1902. By then Edgar Hager had two children, Edgar Browne Hager, Jr. (1899–19??) and Virginia Patton Hager (1901–1979). In their later lives, Edgar Jr. lived in Ashland, Virginia in Louisa. In his later life, Edgar Sr. married Sylvia "Kittie" Wiley of Lewisburg, West Virginia with whom he had a son, Samuel Patton Hager, II (b. and d. April 10, 1933) and an adopted daughter, Kittie Brown Hager (born 1934).

Hager died December 19, 1935, of a heart attack. He was buried at Ashland Cemetery. Published in 1912, A History of Kentucky and Kentuckians contains a detailed biography of the lawyer/politician.

References

External links
 Hager, Edgar Browne at U.S. Biographies Project

1868 births
1935 deaths
School superintendents in Kentucky
Criminal defense lawyers
Kentucky lawyers
Kentucky Wesleyan College alumni
Mayors of Ashland, Kentucky
Lawyers from Charleston, West Virginia
People from Chattanooga, Tennessee
People from Paintsville, Kentucky
19th-century American lawyers
20th-century American lawyers